Hotel Babylon was a 1996 late night music programme hosted by Dani Behr, and made by LWT for the ITV network's ITV Night Time strand. It was created jointly by the production company Planet 24 & brewer Heineken. The premise of the programme is a mock hotel where musicians and bands visited, and would be invited to play in the hotel's lounge and be interviewed in the adjected bar.

Controversy  
Hotel Babylon was noted as one of the first commercially associated programmes on broadcast television in the United Kingdom. This is where not only the sponsor just sponsored the programme which was common on commercial television, but actually have some significant control in way it is directed. This was before the rules on commercial sponsorship and product placement were liberalise in 2011. 

Before the programme was about to launch, a fax from the head of the advertising department of Heineken's headquarters in the Netherlands to programme's British producers was leaked to the Independent newspaper. In the fax, it criticised the programme by saying that the programme in question didn't emphasise the company's signature products, that the studio audience was too edgy with not enough "normal people", and had too many "negroes". This caused an outrage both within the programme and outside with noted black MP Bernie Grant asking for an explanation. This led to a heavy cloud over with the programme, and it only broadcast a single series.

References

External links
 
Hotel Babylon at BFI

Hotel Babylon (music programme)
Hotel Babylon (music programme)
Hotel Babylon (music programme)
Hotel Babylon (music programme)
Hotel Babylon
1996 controversies